Offroad Finnmark is an annual offroad mountain bike race which takes place in Finnmark, Norway.

Race profile

The race offers the ultimate terrain challenge, as the riders use GPS navigation to find their way across Finnmark's mountain plateau. Offroad Finnmark consists of two different races:of700 - our toughest challenge - a 700 km team competition and of300 - a 300 km team competition. From 2016 the shorter of150 is also an Offroad Finnmark - race.

The Offroad Finnmark  pursuit is a one-stage race as well, being a bit more accessible to teams consisting of more participants than just international winners. Though shorter than the of700, the of300 is a demanding ultra marathon offering higher speeds chase yet still retaining some of the most stunning wilderness the Arctic has to offer.

Categories
Due to safety reasons, of300/700 and of150-junir is a team race. 
Teams must contain 2-3 riders.
There are: 
men's teams 
women's teams 
mixed teams
The of150 offers two races with normal age classes: of150 solo and of150 fatbike

Participants
Offroad Finnmark is such a challenge that all teams are subject to individual scrutiny, every applicant is deemed fit or not fit to complete the race they've applied for by offroadfinnmark's board. These decisions are made based on the riders' CV. Previous contestants has included national champions, international champions and world cup winners such as Gerit Pfuhl, Antje Bornhak, Tor Halvor Bjørnstad, Erik Skovgaard Knudsen and Rune Høydahl.

Prizes
There are individual cash prizes for each category of teams in addition to the 1-3 place pursuit winners of both the of700 and of300.

Route
The Offroad Finnmark 700 km race takes the riders across most of Finnmark, Norway's northernmost county. The route passes historic places such as Masi, Soussjavri, Karasjok, Jotka and Kautokeino.

References

External links
 Official homepage

Cycle races in Norway
Sport in Finnmark
Culture in Finnmark
Mountain biking events in Norway